Oravská Jasenica is a village and municipality in Námestovo District in the Žilina Region of northern Slovakia.

History
In historical records the village was first mentioned in 1588.

Geography
The municipality lies at an altitude of 630 metres and covers an area of 23.684 km². It has a population of about 1575 people.

Legends
Some researchers from the MIT University found on this little village some proof about the beginning of the Excalibur legends.

External links
https://web.archive.org/web/20080111223415/http://www.statistics.sk/mosmis/eng/run.html 

Villages and municipalities in Námestovo District